"Mayday on the Frontline" is a single by MC Ren from the CB4 soundtrack that was also featured on MC Ren's debut album, Shock of the Hour. The single and its video found some airplay but it did not make it to any charts.

Music video
The music video features MC Ren rapping in an abandoned warehouse. Scenes from CB4 were seen in the music video. Chris Rock and Allen Payne made cameo appearances in the music video.

Single track listing

A-Side
"May Day on the Front Line" (LP Version) – 4:00

B-Side
"May Day on the Front Line" (Edit) – 4:00  
"May Day on the Front Line" (Instrumental) – 3:52

Songs written by MC Ren
1992 songs
1993 singles
MC Ren songs
MCA Records singles
Gangsta rap songs